The Liberators was a science fiction comic book series based on concepts created by Dez Skinn and Will Simpson for the British anthology title Warrior. The series was intended as a far-future continuation of Skinn's proposed shared continuity 'Warrior-verse', established in the Big Ben strip which also ran in Warrior. The Liberators was one of the first mainstream continuing strips scripted by Grant Morrison.

Plot
The scenario is the British capital of London in 2470. A ragtag group of human misfits with strange powers struggle against an occupying force of malevolent, shape-shifting alien beings.

After a disastrous guerilla assault on one of the invaders' living ships, the protagonists are attacked by the unstoppable Wardroid. Meanwhile, in the ruins of the Houses of Parliament, secrets are unearthed that may be the key to understanding the aliens' true motives.

Publication history
The Liberators first featured in Warrior #22, cover dated September 1984.  After an initial 5 page installment, Death Run, written by Skinn himself and drawn by John Ridgway, the scripting of the series was handed over to Grant Morrison. Morrison's first 5-page installment, Night Moves, saw publication in Warrior 26, the final issue of the series, cover dated February 1986.

A 6-issue Liberators title by Morrison and Ridgway was announced by Quality Comics for publication in the American market in 1986, but was never published.

In 1996 a previously unpublished Liberators strip by Morrison and Ridgway, Angels and Demons, was published alongside an expanded reprint of Night Moves in the Warrior "Spring Special"/Comics International #67 flipbook.

References

External links
 Quality Communications homepage
 Grant Morrison's homepage
 Richard Arndt's Warrior Index

Warrior titles
Fiction set in the 25th century
Comics set in London